Koster may refer to:

People
Koster (surname), a common Dutch surname

Places
 Koster Islands, two islands west of Sweden
 Koster, North West, a town in South Africa named after Bastiaan Koster, the original farm owner
 Koster Site, an archeological site in Illinois named after Theodore Koster, the original farm owner

Other uses
 Koster (beer), a German beer
 HSwMS Koster (M73), a Swedish Koster-class mine countermeasures vessel
 Koster Commando, a light infantry regiment of the South African Army

See also
 
 Coster (disambiguation)
 Köster